Hampton High School is a high school located in Hampton, New Brunswick, Canada. It opened in September 1992 to alleviate the overcrowding at Kennebecasis Valley High School.

Hampton High initially housed grades 10–12. In August 1996, grade 9 was moved from Hampton Junior High School. In August 1997, grade 9 students from Macdonald Consolidated School moved in and four additional classrooms were added.

References

High schools in New Brunswick
Schools in Kings County, New Brunswick
Hampton, New Brunswick